Yukarıçakmak can refer to:

 Yukarıçakmak, Elâzığ
 Yukarıçakmak, Pasinler